Oroperipatus is a genus of Neotropical velvet worms in the family Peripatidae. Species in this genus are found in South America west of the Andes and in Mexico. Velvet worms in this genus can have as few as 22 pairs of legs (in O. omeyrus) or as many as 40 leg pairs (in O. bluntschli and O. weyrauchi). This genus is viviparous, with mothers supplying nourishment to their embryos through a placenta.

Species 
The genus contains the following species:
 Oroperipatus balzani (Camerano, 1897)
 Oroperipatus belli (Bouvier, 1904)
 Oroperipatus bimbergi (Fuhrmann, 1913)
 Oroperipatus bluntschli Fuhrmann, 1915
 Oroperipatus cameranoi (Bouvier, 1899)
 Oroperipatus corradoi (Camerano, 1898)
 Oroperipatus ecuadorensis (Bouvier, 1902)
 Oroperipatus eisenii (Wheeler, 1898)
 Oroperipatus intermedius (Bouvier, 1901)
 Oroperipatus koepckei Zilch, 1954
 Oroperipatus lankesteri (Bouvier, 1899)
 Oroperipatus multipodes (Fuhrmann, 1913)
 Oroperipatus omeyrus Marcus, 1952
 Oroperipatus peruvianus Brues, 1917
 Oroperipatus soratanus (Bouvier, 1901)
 Oroperipatus tuberculatus (Bouvier, 1898)
 Oroperipatus weyrauchi Marcus, 1952

Oroperipatus goudoti (Bouvier, 1899), Oroperipatus quitensis (Schmarda, 1871), and Oroperipatus peruanus (Grube, 1876) are considered nomina dubia by Oliveira et al. 2012.

References 

Onychophorans of tropical America
Onychophoran genera